Events from the year 1327 in the Kingdom of Scotland.

Incumbents
Monarch – Robert I

Events
 3–4 August – Scottish victory at Battle of Stanhope Park, County Durham

Deaths
 27 October – Elizabeth de Burgh, the second wife and the only queen consort of King Robert the Bruce.

See also

 Timeline of Scottish history

References

 
Years of the 14th century in Scotland
Wars of Scottish Independence